Auburn Township is one of the sixteen townships of Geauga County, Ohio, United States. As of the 2010 census the population was 6,443, up from 5,158 at the 2000 census.

Geography
Located in the southern part of the county, it borders the following townships and city:
Newbury Township - north
Burton Township - northeast corner
Troy Township - east
Hiram Township, Portage County - southeast corner
Mantua Township, Portage County - south
Aurora - southwest corner
Bainbridge Township - west
Russell Township - northwest corner

No municipalities are located in Auburn Township.

Name and history
Statewide, other Auburn Townships are located in Crawford and Tuscarawas counties. Auburn Township was founded by the Bradley and Snow families of South Newbury, New Hampshire.

Government
The township is governed by a three-member board of trustees, who are elected in November of odd-numbered years to a four-year term beginning on the following January 1. Two are elected in the year after the presidential election and one is elected in the year before it. There is also an elected township fiscal officer, who serves a four-year term beginning on April 1 of the year after the election, which is held in November of the year before the presidential election. Vacancies in the fiscal officership or on the board of trustees are filled by the remaining trustees.

Notable person
Clayton E. Crafts, Speaker of the Illinois House of Representatives and lawyer, was born in Auburn Township.
The Leader Tractor, was originally produced in Auburn.

References

External links
Township website
County website

Townships in Geauga County, Ohio
Populated places established in 1814
Townships in Ohio